Canada Cup 2000 was the third Canada Cup competition in women's rugby hosted in Winnipeg. The hosts, Canada, brought together the new World Champion New Zealand alongside runners-up USA and third placed England. The results were slightly closer than in 1996, but the title was retained by New Zealand.

Final table

Results

Round 1

Round 2

Round 3

See also
Women's international rugby - includes all women's international match results
Churchill Cup

2000 rugby union tournaments for national teams
2000
2000 in Canadian rugby union
2000 in New Zealand rugby union
2000 in American rugby union
2000–01 in English rugby union
2000 in women's rugby union
2000 in American women's sports
2000 in Canadian women's sports
2000 in English women's sport